WWE Hall of Fame (2013) was the event which featured the introduction of the 14th class to the WWE Hall of Fame. The event was produced by WWE on April 6, 2013 from Madison Square Garden in New York City, New York. The event took place the same weekend as WrestleMania 29. The event was hosted by Jerry Lawler. A condensed one-hour version of the ceremony aired on the USA Network the following Tuesday. In March 2015 the ceremony was added to the WWE Network.

Background
After leaving the WWF (now WWE), Sammartino became an outspoken critic of the path on which Vince McMahon has taken professional wrestling. He particularly criticised the use of steroids and "vulgar" storylines. In 2013, Sammartino accepted an invitation for induction into the Hall of Fame, after having declined several times in prior years. He finally accepted the offer to join because he was satisfied with the way the company had addressed his concerns about the direction of the business. In April 2018, Sean Waltman announced on his podcast, that should Sammartino not have accepted the invitation to be inducted, D-Generation X would have been inducted.

Event
Mick Foley was inducted by his long time friend Terry Funk. The two discussed all their times on the road together which included time at WWE, World Championship Wrestling and Extreme Championship Wrestling. Foley also said that he had regrets from his career. The main one was that he never beat Chris Jericho. Jericho then ran up on the stage, laid down, and told Foley to pin him. Foley originally acted like he couldn't and was walking away when he ran back and dropped an elbow on Jericho. He then pinned Jericho and CM Punk counted the one-two-three, jokingly giving Foley his first victory over Jericho.

Bob Backlund was inducted by Maria Menounos.

Trish Stratus was inducted by Stephanie McMahon. During Stratus' speech she announced that she was expecting her first child, a son, later in 2013.

Vince McMahon inducted businessman and future U.S. president Donald Trump. Vince spoke of Trump and their working relationship during WrestleMania IV and WrestleMania V, as well as the "Battle of the Billionaires" at WrestleMania 23.

Booker T was inducted by his brother Stevie Ray, whom he had teamed together with for many years as Harlem Heat. Booker T later admitted during an interview with John Layfield, on his show Legends with JBL on the WWE Network, that prior to him asking Stevie Ray to induct him, that the brothers had not spoken in nearly 5 years.

The final inductee of the evening was Bruno Sammartino who was inducted by Arnold Schwarzenegger. Although Sammartino saw great success in New York City during his career, this event marked Sammartino's return to the WWE after 25 years. It was just the second time in Hall of Fame history that Vince McMahon would be seen on camera, after 2009 when he inducted Stone Cold Steve Austin.

Aftermath
Sammartino appeared on the October 7, 2013, episode of Raw and received a birthday greeting in his hometown of Pittsburgh. On March 28, 2015, Sammartino inducted Larry Zbyszko into the Hall of Fame class of 2015.

Inductees

Individual
 Class headliners appear in boldface

Celebrity

References

WWE Hall of Fame ceremonies
2013 in professional wrestling
2013 in New York City
Events in New York City
Professional wrestling in New York City
April 2013 events in the United States